The following properties are listed on the National Register of Historic Places in Brooklyn.

This is intended to be a complete list of properties and districts listed on the National Register of Historic Places in the New York City borough of Brooklyn, which coincides with Kings County, New York.  The locations of National Register properties and districts (at least for all showing latitude and longitude coordinates below) may be seen in a map by clicking on "Map of all coordinates".



Current listings

|}

See also
 Statewide: National Register of Historic Places listings in New York
 Citywide: Manhattan, Queens, Staten Island, Bronx
 List of New York City Designated Landmarks in Brooklyn

References

History of Brooklyn
Kings County
Kings